NASA has several visitor centers, including:

References

See also
 Air Force Space and Missile Museum (Cape Canaveral)
 :Category:NASA visitor centers

 
Vis